Perry County is a county located in the central portion of the U.S. state of Alabama. As of the 2020 census, the population was 8,511. Its county seat is Marion. The county was established in 1819 and is named in honor of Commodore Oliver Hazard Perry of Rhode Island and the United States Navy. Perry County is the only county in Alabama, and one of 40 in the United States, not to have access to any wired broadband connections.

History
In 1935, a sharecropper called Joe Spinner Johnson was organizing sharecroppers into a union. His landlord called him away from his job, and gave him up to a gang of whites. They tied him up, beat him, and took him to Selma, where he was thrown in jail. Other prisoners heard him screaming and being beaten. A few days later, his mutilated body turned up near Greensboro.

The Perry County town of Marion was the site of a 1965 killing of an unarmed Black man, Jimmie Lee Jackson, by a white state trooper, James Bonard Fowler, which sparked the Selma to Montgomery marches. In 2008, the county voted to establish a Barack Obama Day, a legal holiday, every second Monday of November.

Geography
The county boasts a diverse geography, with the southern half of the county being located in the Gulf Coastal Plain region, and the northern half of the county being located in the far southern extensions of the foothills of the Ridge-and-Valley Appalachians. This area is mainly forested, with some hills and valleys.

Major highways
 U.S. Highway 80
 State Route 5
 State Route 14
 State Route 61
 State Route 175
 State Route 183
 State Route 219
 State Route 289

Adjacent counties
Bibb County (north)
Chilton County (northeast)
Dallas County (east)
Marengo County (southwest)
Hale County (west)

National protected area
 Talladega National Forest (part)

Demographics

2020 census

As of the 2020 United States census, there were 8,511 people, 3,070 households, and 1,476 families residing in the county.

2010 census
As of the 2010 United States Census, there were 10,591 people living in the county. 68.7% were Black or African American, 30.3% White, 0.3% Asian, 0.2% Native American, 0.2% of some other race and 0.4% of two or more races. 1.1% were Hispanic or Latino (of any race).

2000 census
As of the census of 2000, there were 11,861 people, 4,333 households, and 3,046 families living in the county.  The population density was 16 people per square mile (6/km2).  There were 5,406 housing units at an average density of 8 per square mile (3/km2).  The racial makeup of the county was 68.38% Black or African American, 30.86% White, 0.08% Native American, 0.03% Asian, 0.03% Pacific Islander, 0.08% from other races, and 0.54% from two or more races.  Nearly 0.86% of the population were Hispanic or Latino of any race.

There were 4,333 households, out of which 33.80% had children under the age of 18 living with them, 40.40% were married couples living together, 25.10% had a female householder with no husband present, and 29.70% were non-families. Nearly 27.90% of all households were made up of individuals, and 12.00% had someone living alone who was 65 years of age or older.  The average household size was 2.63, and the average family size was 3.23.

In the county, the population was spread out, with 29.80% under the age of 18, 11.10% from 18 to 24, 23.60% from 25 to 44, 20.70% from 45 to 64, and 14.90% who were 65 years of age or older.  The median age was 33 years. For every 100 females, there were 83.90 males.  For every 100 females age 18 and over, there were 78.40 males.

The median income for a household in the county was $20,200, and the median income for a family was $26,150. Males had a median income of $26,272 versus $16,839 for females. The per capita income for the county was $10,948.  About 31.20% of families and 35.40% of the population were below the poverty line, including 48.90% of those under age 18 and 25.80% of those age 65 or over.

Government
Perry County Circuit Clerk

Communities

Cities
 Marion (county seat)
 Uniontown

Unincorporated communities

Adler
Augustin
Folsom
Hamburg
Heiberger
Jericho
Levert
Morgan Springs
Oakmulgee
Osborn
Perryville
Radford
Sprott
Suttle
Vaiden
Vilula

Places of interest
Perry County is home to Perry Lakes Park, part of the Talladega National Forest, the Alabama Women's Hall of Fame located at Judson College, and Marion Military Institute.

See also
National Register of Historic Places listings in Perry County, Alabama
Properties on the Alabama Register of Landmarks and Heritage in Perry County, Alabama

References

Further reading
 English, Bertis D. Civil Wars, Civil Beings, and Civil Rights in Alabama's Black Belt: A History of Perry County (University Alabama Press, 2020).
 Fraser, Rory F., Buddhi R. Gyawali, and John Schelhas. "Blacks in space: Land tenure and well-being in Perry County, Alabama." Small-Scale Forest Economics, Management and Policy 4 (2005): 21-33. online

External links
 Official website of Perry County Sheriff
 Perry County map of roads/towns (map © 2007 Univ. of Alabama)

 

 
1819 establishments in Alabama
Populated places established in 1819
Black Belt (U.S. region)
Majority-minority counties in Alabama